87th Division or 87th Infantry Division may refer to:

 Infantry divisions 
 87th African Infantry Division, a French Army unit of the Second World War
 87th Infantry Division (German Empire), a unit of the Imperial German Army 
 87th Infantry Division (Germany), a unit of the German Army 
 87th Division (National Revolutionary Army), a unit of the Republic of China's National Revolutionary Army
 87th Division (2nd Formation) (People's Republic of China)
87th Rifle Division, a unit of the Soviet Army
 87th Infantry Division (United States), a unit of the United States Army

See also 
 87th Regiment (disambiguation)
 87th Squadron (disambiguation)